Jahongir Şavkatovič Aliev (born 14 July 1996) is a Tajik international footballer who plays as a midfielder for Ravshan Zafarobod.

Club career
On 11 January 2016, FC Istiklol announced that they had signed Aliev on a three-year contract from Khujand in preparation for their 2016 AFC Cup campaign.

In January 2018, Aliev went on trial with Uzbekistan Super League side Nasaf Qarshi, signing a one-year contract with the club on 15 January. In June 2018, he left Nasaf Qarshi.

On 3 July 2018, Aliev re-signed for FK Khujand.

International career
Aliev made his debut for Tajikistan on 13 October 2015 against Jordan.

Career statistics

Club

International

Honours
 Istiklol
 Tajik League (2): 2016, 2017
 Tajik Cup (1): 2016
 Tajik Supercup (1): 2016

References

1996 births
Living people
Tajikistani footballers
Sportspeople from Dushanbe
Association football midfielders
FC Istiklol players
FC Nasaf players
Tajikistan Higher League players
Uzbekistan Super League players
Tajikistan international footballers
Tajikistani expatriate footballers
Expatriate footballers in Uzbekistan
Tajikistani expatriate sportspeople in Uzbekistan
Tajikistan youth international footballers